Ferrissia rivularis is a species of gastropods belonging to the family Planorbidae.

The species is found in Northern America.

References

Planorbidae
Gastropods described in 1817